Richard Edward Cooke (born 4 September 1965) is an English former footballer who played as a winger in the Football League for Tottenham Hotspur, Birmingham City, AFC Bournemouth and Luton Town. He was capped once by England at under-21 level.

Cooke played for Tottenham Hotspur as an apprentice, and played some first team games. He scored on his debut in November 1983 in an away win at Kenilworth Road versus Luton Town. He was an unused substitute in the 1984 UEFA Cup Final first leg. He later transferred to Luton Town and AFC Bournemouth, where he ended his career. He suffered a knee injury during a game versus Leyton Orient which subsequently ended his playing career. He went on to work as a London taxi driver.

Honours
Tottenham Hotspur
UEFA Cup winner 1984

References

External links
 

1965 births
Living people
Footballers from Islington (district)
English footballers
England under-21 international footballers
Association football midfielders
Tottenham Hotspur F.C. players
Birmingham City F.C. players
AFC Bournemouth players
Luton Town F.C. players
English Football League players
UEFA Cup winning players